Agia Paraskevi (Bulgarian/: Sveta Petka, Sveta Petka) is a village in the Florina regional unit, Western Macedonia, Greece.
The village of Agia Paraskevi is one of several border villages along the frontier of Greece and North Macedonia with a Slavophone population.
The village is a flat agricultural village at an elevation of 612 metres. Agia Paraskevi is neighboured by Dragosh (North Macedonia), Ethnikon, Parori, Kato Kleines, Polyplatanos and Niki.

Demographics
Agia Paraskevi had 231 inhabitants in 1981. In fieldwork done by Riki Van Boeschoten in late 1993, Agia Paraskevi was populated by Slavophones. The Macedonian language was spoken by people over 60, mainly in private.

Culture

Churches
Agia Paraskevi has three churches. The oldest house of worship was the chapel of Agia Paraskevi (Sveta Petka) built in 1570 and was a Holy church of the area. In 1827, it was torched and destroyed by Ottoman Turks. In 1886 a small chapel was built at the site, which was enlarged later by the 25th Army of Epiros. The church of Saint Nikola(s) was built in 1856 and for a short time provided a cemetery, however the cemetery was subject to flooding from melting snow, it was relocated to the church of Saint Dimitrios which was erected in 1859.

Notes and sources

http://pandektis.ekt.gr/pandektis/

Populated places in Florina (regional unit)